Time on My Hands may refer to:

"Time on My Hands" (song), a 1930 popular song
Time on My Hands (John Scofield album), 1990
Time on My Hands (Duke Jordan album), 1988
"Time on My Hands" (Dad's Army), an episode of the British situation comedy Dad's Army
"Time on My Hands" an episode of the animated television series Rocky and Bullwinkle
Time on My Hands (film), a 1932 animated film